Matia may refer to:

 Matia gens, an ancient Roman family
 Matia Island, a part of the San Juan Islands
 Matia, North 24 Parganas, village with a police station
 Matia, a clan of the Bharwad people of India

People with the name
 Matia Chowdhury (born 1942), Bangladeshi politician
 Matia Karrell, American film, television and screenwriter
 Matia Kasaija (born 1944), Ugandan politician
 Paul Ramon Matia (born 1937), United States federal judge